Geyse da Silva Ferreira  (born 27 March 1998), commonly known as Geyse or Pretinha, is a Brazilian professional footballer who plays as a forward for Primera División club Barcelona and the Brazil women's national team.

Early life
Geyse de Silva Ferreira was born on 27 March 1998, in Maragogi, Brazil. She was born to Maria Cristina "Cris" Gomes da Silva, a street sweeper and daycare worker who raised Geyse and her five siblings- Aline, Geovanne, Gisele, Alisson, and José Willamys- as a single mother.  Geyse's father, a fisherman, had an abusive relationship with her mother.

Geyse played futsal for two years in Pernambuco. She later played football for União Desportiva Alagoana (UDA), a team based in Maceió. She then moved to Centro Olímpico, where she made limited appearances.

Club career

Corinthians (2017) 
Geyse debuted for Corinthians on 12 March 2017, scoring in a 4–0 win over São Francisco. Throughout her single season with Corinthians, she played in 27 matches and scored nine goals.

Madrid CFF (2017–2018) 
Geyse made her first move to the Spanish league in 2017 when she signed for the newly promoted Madrid CFF from Corinthians. Geyse made just 11 appearances and scored two goals as Madrid finished 10th place in the league.

Benfica (2018–2019) 
Geyse agreed to a transfer to the newly formed S.L. Benfica in May 2018. She joined her new team in September 2018, after playing for Brazil at the 2018 FIFA U-20 Women's World Cup. She scored 16 goals in her first four games for Benfica, who had entered the second division in Portugal. Geyse also scored 6 goals in one match against Almeirim. By the end of the season, Geyse had scored 51 goals in 29 matches for the club, 41 of those being league goals and the other 9 being scored in the 2018–19 Taça de Portugal Feminina.

In the first half of the 2019–20 Campeonato Nacional Feminino season, Geyse featured in eight matches and scored just one goal. In January 2020, Benfica rescinded their contract with Geyse by mutual agreement.

Second stint at Madrid CFF (2020–2022) 
In January 2020, Geyse re-signed for Madrid CFF, which was at the bottom of the Primera División table. She scored five goals from 5 league matches before the 2019–20 league season was ended prematurely due to the COVID-19 pandemic in Spain. On 21 July 2020, Geyse extended her contract with Madrid CFF to the end of 2020–21 season.

The following season, on 21 April 2021, Geyse scored in the quarterfinal of the 2020–21 Copa de la Reina in a 2–1 victory over Real Madrid. Madrid CFF faced eventual treble-winners FC Barcelona in the semifinals, and Geyse played all 90 minutes as they fell in a 4–0 defeat.

On 10 October 2021, Geyse scored four goals in a 5-4 Madrid CFF win against Real Betis. In the quarterfinals of the 2021–22 Copa de la Reina, Geyse scored but was sent off with a red card. Madrid ended up losing the match in extra time. Although Madrid CFF finished 13th in the league, Geyse finished her second season at Madrid CFF with a league-high 20 goals. She earned her first Pichichi title, which she split with Barcelona's Asisat Oshoala, who also scored 20 league goals. Geyse became the first South American in the Spanish women's league to achieve top scorers honors.

Barcelona (2022-present)
In June 2022, Geyse is announced by the victorious Spanish club FC Barcelona Femení, where she will wear the number 18 shirt with a contract until 2024.

International career

Youth national teams 
In April 2015, 17-year-old Geyse's performances for União Desportiva in their run to the quarterfinal of the 2015 Copa do Brasil de Futebol Feminino led her to be called up for Brazil women's national under-20 football team training. She went on to become an important player for Brazil at the 2016 edition of the FIFA U-20 Women's World Cup.

At the 2018 South American U-20 Women's Championship, Geyse scored four goals in the group stages, with a brace in a 2–0 win over Venezuela and another brace in a 3–0 win over Uruguay. In the final stage, she scored once in every match, with one goal in Brazil's match against Colombia, two goals in their match against Venezuela, and five goals in their final match against Paraguay, which ended 8–1. Geyse finished as the tournament's top scorer with 12 total goals in 7 games and was selected as Player of the Tournament. Geyse later competed with Brazil in her second FIFA U-20 Women's World Cup competition in August 2018. Brazil finished second in Group B with 1 point, with Geyse registering one goal in a 1–2 loss against North Korea.

Senior national team 
Geyse made her debut for the senior Brazil women's national football team in September 2017 as a substitute in a 4–0 win over Chile. She was selected in Brazil's 23-player squad for the 2019 FIFA Women's World Cup in France, after a prolific season with Benfica at club level. Geyse made two appearances in Brazil's 2019 Women's World Cup tournament, their first group stage match against Jamaica, and their quarterfinal defeat against France.

Geyse scored her first senior national team goal at the 2021 SheBelieves Cup, Brazil's fourth goal in a 4–1 victory against Argentina. Later in the year, Geyse was called up by Pia Sundhage to represent Brazil at the 2021 Summer Olympics.

International goals

Personal life 
Geyse gifted her mother and siblings a house with the money she earned from football. Geyse has her mother's face tattooed on her left arm.

Honours

Benfica
 Campeonato Nacional II Divisão Feminino: 2018–19
 Taça de Portugal: 2018–19

Brazil
 Copa América Femenina: 2022

Individual 

 Pichichi Trophy: 2021–22
 South American U-20 Women's Championship Top scorer: 2018
 South American U-20 Women's Championship Player of the Tournament: 2018

References

External links
 Geyse at FC Barcelona
 
 
 

1998 births
Living people
Sportspeople from Alagoas
Brazilian women's footballers
Brazil women's international footballers
Brazilian expatriate women's footballers
Brazilian expatriate sportspeople in Spain
Brazilian expatriate sportspeople in Portugal
Expatriate women's footballers in Spain
Expatriate women's footballers in Portugal
Women's association football forwards
Primera División (women) players
Campeonato Nacional de Futebol Feminino players
Madrid CFF players
Associação Desportiva Centro Olímpico players
Sport Club Corinthians Paulista (women) players
S.L. Benfica (women) footballers
2019 FIFA Women's World Cup players
Sociedade Esportiva Palmeiras (women) players
Footballers at the 2020 Summer Olympics
Olympic footballers of Brazil